The Boys Didn't Wear Hair Gel Before (Spanish:Los muchachos de antes no usaban gomina) is a 1937 Argentine historical drama film directed and written by Manuel Romero and starring Florencio Parravicini, Mecha Ortiz and Santiago Arrieta.

Plot
The aristocratic Alberto Rosales (Arrieta) falls in love with the blond tango dancer Rubia Mireya (Ortiz) leaving his fiancée (Córdoba). His father convinces him to give her up and return to his respectable fiancée. Ten years later Alberto and Rubia meet again at a charitable event organized by his wife. He wants to rekindle the romance, but when his two children burst on to the scene, she leaves without a word. Though she still cares for him, she will not allow his children to become fatherless.

Cast
 Florencio Parravicini as 	Ponce - Mocho
 Mecha Ortiz as La Rubia Mireya
 Santiago Arrieta	 as	Alberto
 Irma Córdoba	 as	Camila Peña
 Martín Zabalúa	 as	Carlos Rosales
 Niní Gambier	         as	Inés Rosales
 Alfonso Pisano	 as	Euclides García Fuentes
 Mary Parets as	Lucy Rosales
 Pedro Laxalt as	Jorge Rosales
 Aurelia Musto	 as	Sra.Rosales
 Hugo del Carril	 as	El cantor
 María Vitaliani	 as	Sra. Peña
 Amalia Bernabé	 as	Amiga de Camila
 Fernando Borel	  as Jorge Newbery
 Eduardo de Labar	 as Hansen
 Homero Cárpena	 as Guapo Salinas
 Malisa Zini	 as Amiga de Camila
 Isabel Figlioli	 as Mujer del cabaret
 Jorge Lanza    	 as Amigo de Rivera
 Carlos Enríquez	 as	Vendedor de globos
 Osvaldo Miranda	 as 	Amigo de los Rosales
 Roberto Blanco

Reception
The film's title alludes nostalgically to the past, referring to an era before young men began wearing hair gel which was commonplace by the mid-1930s. It was a popular success, one of the major hits of the Golden Age of Argentine Cinema. It marked the film debut of the actor and singer Hugo del Carril who quickly went on to become a leading star. The film was remade in 1969.

References

Bibliography 
 Rist, Peter H. Historical Dictionary of South American Cinema. Rowman & Littlefield, 2014.

External links

1937 films
1930s historical drama films
Argentine historical drama films
1930s Spanish-language films
Argentine black-and-white films
Films directed by Manuel Romero
Films set in Buenos Aires
1937 drama films
1930s Argentine films